The 6th Canadian Parliament was in session from April 13, 1887, until February 3, 1891. The membership was set by the 1887 federal election on February 22, 1887. It was dissolved prior to the 1891 election.

It was controlled by a Conservative/Liberal-Conservative majority under Prime Minister Sir John A. Macdonald and the 3rd Canadian Ministry.  The Official Opposition was the Liberal Party, led first by Edward Blake, and later by Wilfrid Laurier.

The Speaker was Joseph-Aldric Ouimet.  See also List of Canadian electoral districts 1887-1892 for a list of the ridings in this parliament.

There were four sessions of the 6th Parliament:

List of members

Following is a full list of members of the sixth Parliament listed first by province, then by electoral district.

Electoral districts denoted by an asterisk (*) indicates that district was represented by two members.

British Columbia

Manitoba

New Brunswick

Northwest Territories

Nova Scotia

Ontario

Prince Edward Island

Quebec

By-elections

References

Succession

06th Canadian parliament
1887 establishments in Canada
1891 disestablishments in Canada
1887 in Canada
1888 in Canada
1889 in Canada
1890 in Canada
1891 in Canada